Pitbull Studio Limited was a British video game developer based in Houghton-le-Spring, England, with additional offices in Guildford and Leamington Spa.

History 
Pitbull Studio was formed in 2010, a year after the collapse of Midway Studios – Newcastle. Initially working on motion tracking games for the health sector, the studio later won a contract to develop Unreal Engine 4 with Epic Games.

On 5 August 2014, Epic Games announced that Pitbull Studios would effectively be merged into a new development entity, Epic Games UK.

Games developed

References 

British companies established in 2010
British companies disestablished in 2014
Epic Games
Defunct video game companies of the United Kingdom
Video game companies established in 2010
Video game companies disestablished in 2014
Video game development companies
Defunct companies based in Tyne and Wear
2010 establishments in England
2014 disestablishments in England